Steinenbronn is a town in the district of Böblingen in Baden-Württemberg in Germany.
The district has one public school and five kindergartens. The east side is industrial while the west side of the town is rather urban.

Geography

Steinenbronn lies on the edge of the Nationalpark Schönbuch at the old trade route Stuttgart – Tübingen, five kilometers south of Leinfelden-Echterdingen, three kilometers north of Waldenbuch and five kilometers east of Schönaich.

Politics

Mayor
since the end of World War II:
 1945–1950: Gottlob Krauß
 1950–1980: Reinhold Buck
 1980–1996: Hermann Walz
 1996–2020: Johann Singer
 since 2020: Ronny Habakuk

Municipal Council
Elections in May 2014:
Freie Wähler (Free voters): 5 seats
CDU: 5 seats
Offene Grüne Liste (Open green list): 2 seats
SPD: 2 seats

Infrastructure
From 1928 to 1965 Steinenbronn was part of the Siebenmühlentalbahn (Leinfelden-Waldenbuch). Today Steinenbronn is connected to the mass transit of Stuttgart.
Steinenbronn is located at the former Bundesstraße 27, now Landstraße 1208 which connects Stuttgart and Tübingen.

important Distances:
Stuttgart-Airport: 8 km
Stuttgart: 20 km
Tübingen: 24 km

Education
Steinenbronn is the seat of a secondary school with more than 400 students.

Twin towns 
 Quinsac (France), since 1966
 Polla (Italy), since 1991
 Le Rœulx (Belgium), since 1992
 Bernsdorf, since German reunion

References

Böblingen (district)